Walpurga or Walpurgis may refer to

 Saint Walpurga (8th century), an English missionary in Germany
 Walpurgis Night, a holiday celebrated in Central and Northern Europe
 Royal Armouries Ms. I.33, a medieval manuscript on swordsmanship which is also called "Walpurgis MS"
 La Noche de Walpurgis, a Spanish horror movie
 256 Walpurga, Main Belt asteroid
 Maria Antonia Walpurgis of Bavaria (1724–1780), princess of Bavaria
 Walpurga von Isacescu (born 1870), Austrian swimmer

In music
 Duchess Maria Antonia of Bavaria (1724–1780), musician
 Die erste Walpurgisnacht (First Walpurgis Night), a cantata for choir and orchestra by Felix Mendelssohn
 Repent Walpurgis by Procol Harum
 Walpurgis Night, a 1984 album by German heavy metal band Stormwitch
 "War Pigs", a song by Black Sabbath originally called "Walpurgis"
 "Walpurgisnacht", a song by German pagan folk / medieval band Faun
 Walpurgis (album), a 2021 album by Japanese singer Aimer